Gressmann, Gressman may refer to:

 Evelyn Gressmann (born 1943), German actress
 Hugo Gressmann (1877–1927), a German Old Testament scholar
 Thomas S. Gressman, an American science fiction writer
 Uwe Greßmann (1933–1969), German writer
 4396 Gressmann (1981 JH), a main-belt asteroid discovered on 1981 by Ted Bowell

See also 
 Related & Similar surnames
 Kressmann
 Cressman
 Grasmann (Grasman), Grassmann (Grassman), Gruzman

References 

German-language surnames